Iverson Creek is a small river in San Mateo County, California and is a tributary of Pescadero Creek.

Notes

Rivers of San Mateo County, California
Rivers of Northern California